Don't Forget Your Toothbrush was a British light entertainment TV programme that aired on Channel 4 from 12 February 1994 to 25 February 1995 and was hosted by Chris Evans.

Background
Don't Forget Your Toothbrush was written and presented by Chris Evans in his first major venture away from The Big Breakfast. The first pilot was considered unsuccessful by executives and Evans himself. Channel 4 chief executive Michael Grade said that the pilot was "like amateur's hour". After two failed pilots, the broadcaster was reluctant to waste the money that they had spent developing the show. At some point in the process, executive producer Sebastian Scott left the project and Evans invited experienced game show producer William G. Stewart to develop the show. The show ran for two series in 1994 and 1995 on Channel 4. Shows were transmitted live on Saturday nights the first series at 10pm, the second at 9pm. Each episode would be repeated at teatime on the following Monday (series 1) or Sunday (series 2).

The theme music was composed by David Arnold, though Jools Holland (with his Big Band in series one, and Rhythm and Blues Orchestra in series two) provided the music during the live shows. They accompanied the star performers, who included Cher, Barry White, Lulu and Tony Hadley. Evans ended each show with a song. In series one, he sang Morecambe and Wise's "Bring Me Sunshine" with that week's star guest, while in series two he sang Andy Williams' "It's So Easy".

The star guest took part in the Superfan quiz to see if they knew more trivia about themselves than a huge fan, against whom they were competing. The prize was a possession of the stars that only a true fan would value. During the quiz round, usually between questions, Chris Evans would ask for the clock to be stopped, and then have a brief conversation with the celebrity guest regarding the question just asked, before starting it up again for the next one.

Don't Forget Your Toothbrush was also a game show. Each member of the audience was obliged to bring a passport and a packed suitcase to the studio, and to arrange to take the following week off work (unless they were unemployed or, as was pointed out, did not care if they lost their jobs). Two members of the audience were selected to take part in the "Light Your Lemon" quiz as a team, and a postcard was drawn from those sent in by home viewers. The studio contestants were asked a maximum of nine questions, with right and wrong answers lighting a section of a giant cocktail glass or ice cream cone, respectively. If the studio contestants gave five correct answers, they would "light the lemon" on the glass. However, if they missed five, they would "flash the Flake" on the cone and Evans then called the home viewer and asked him/her one question. The studio contestants won a holiday to an exotic destination either by lighting the lemon, or by default if they flashed the Flake and the home viewer either missed his/her question or failed to answer Evans' call within five rings. If the home viewer did answer correctly, he/she won the exotic holiday and the studio contestants received one to a much less appealing destination. The two places were chosen for their alliterative names, such as Martinique versus Margate, and the studio contestants departed immediately after the show for whichever holiday they had won. Evans would introduce this segment by looking between alternate cameras in time to a drum beat that parodied the scene changes from one of his favourite TV shows, Captain Scarlet and the Mysterons.

The hostess for the first series was Evans' then-girlfriend Rachel Tatton-Brown, who had previously worked on The Big Breakfast. Despite being a former model, Tatton-Brown was uncomfortable in front of the cameras and aspired to move onto something else. She was replaced in the second series by his then-new girlfriend, Jadene Doran, whom he frequently introduced as "Ms Let-Your-Hair-Down" and who let her hair fall loose as she arrived onstage, by releasing it from its tied-up style or removing a hat.

One game featured during the second series involved home viewers following Evans' instructions to flash their house lights on and off at a particular moment. A camera crew in a mystery location would search for someone taking part. When a house had been found, the occupants (who were never identified by name on camera) had two minutes to throw 10 named items out of specific windows (e.g. "Throw a sofa cushion out of the downstairs window"). They received £1,000 for winning the game, thrown to them by the camera crew.

In the penultimate episode of the first series, Evans constantly touted a huge surprise throughout the show, but did not reveal it until "Light Your Lemon" was about to begin. He announced that if the studio contestants won the exotic holiday, then every member of the audience would go for a week's holiday at Disneyland Paris. They won, and the whole audience left for Disneyland Paris immediately after the show.

During the second series, it was announced that there would be no third series, in order to allow the show to go out on a high. Evans soon signed up to host the Radio 1 Breakfast Show, and returned to Channel 4 with TFI Friday.

Transmissions

International versions

References

External links

1994 British television series debuts
1995 British television series endings
Channel 4 game shows
English-language television shows
Ginger Productions